Tourret is a French surname. Notable people with the surname include:

 Alain Tourret (born 1947), French politician
 Charles Gilbert Tourret (1795–1858), French agronomist and politician
 Christian Tourret (born 1946), French athlete
 Philippe Tourret (born 1967), French athlete
 Pierre Tourret (1919–1991), French army officer